Furcataenia is a genus of moths belonging to the family Tortricidae.

Species
Furcataenia bifida Razowski & Becker, 2000
Furcataenia cholosaccula Razowski & Becker, 2000
Furcataenia marabana Razowski & Becker, 2000
Furcataenia monofida Razowski & Becker, 2000
Furcataenia trifida Razowski & Becker, 2000

See also
List of Tortricidae genera

References

External links
tortricidae.com

Archipini
Tortricidae genera